Olof Ossian Hugo Stolpe (18 April 1927 – 7 February 2006) was a Finnish footballer and bandy player. He competed in the Finnish football team in the 1952 Summer Olympics and in the Finnish bandy team in the 1952 Winter Olympics, where Finland won the bronze medals in the demonstration competition for bandy.

Most of his football career he played for Vasa IFK. He won the Finnish Championship with VIFK in 1953.

References

External links

1927 births
2006 deaths
Finnish footballers
Finnish bandy players
Olympic footballers of Finland
Footballers at the 1952 Summer Olympics
Association football midfielders
Winter Olympics competitors for Finland
Bandy players at the 1952 Winter Olympics
Medalists at the 1952 Winter Olympics
Finland international footballers
Vasa IFK players
Sportspeople from Vaasa